Myre is the administrative centre of Øksnes Municipality in Nordland county, Norway.  It is located on the northwestern part of the island of Langøya in the Vesterålen archipelago.  Myre is one of the largest fishing villages in the Vesterålen region.  Myre Church is located in this village.

The newspaper Øksnesavisa is published in Myre.

References

Øksnes
Villages in Nordland
Populated places of Arctic Norway
Vesterålen